Clark Hall is a building on the campus of the University of Virginia in Charlottesville, Virginia.  It was completed in 1932 to hold the university's School of Law.  Its two-story, sky-lit, mural-decorated Memorial Library room "is one of the Commonwealth's most significant 20th-century architectural interiors". The building was listed on the National Register of Historic Places on September 5, 2008.

It is the 10th property listed as a featured property of the week in a program of the National Park Service that began in July 2008. Today the building houses the University's Department of Environmental Sciences and the Charles L. Brown Science and Engineering Library.

References

University and college buildings on the National Register of Historic Places in Virginia
National Register of Historic Places in Albemarle County, Virginia
Buildings of the University of Virginia
Buildings and structures completed in 1932
Neoclassical architecture in Virginia
1932 establishments in Virginia